Arum besserianum is a flowering plant species in the family Araceae.

Habitat

Arum besserianum grows in southern Poland and northwest Ukraine.

Taxonomy

Within the genus Arum, it belongs to subgenus Arum, section Dioscoridea, and subsection Discroochiton. Its specific status has been considered dubious, but it has been recognized as a valid species in recent studies.

References

External links

Flora of Europe
Flora of Poland
Flora of Ukraine
besserianum